Mario Gene J. Mendiola was a Filipino politician who was governor of Occidental Mindoro and a representative of the province in the House of Representatives.

Background
Mario Gene Mendiola became involved in politics at a young age. He joined politics after his father Pedro Mendiola, a former representative of Occidental Mindoro in the Interim Batasang Pambansa from 1978 to 1986 was killed by a gunman while delivering a speech in Sablayan in April 1986. He was elected as representative of Occidental Mindoro's lone district in the House of Representatives for the 8th Congress which lasted from 1987 to 1992. 

Mario Mendiola would get elected as vice governor of Occidental Mindoro in 2010 serving until 2013. He was governor of the province from 2013 to 2019. In the 2013 elections, he ran under the Liberal Party, the then-ruling party.

Death
Mendiola died on December 22, 2021 at 63 years old.

References

20th-century births
2021 deaths
Governors of Occidental Mindoro
Members of the House of Representatives of the Philippines from Occidental Mindoro
Liberal Party (Philippines) politicians